is a public park in Minato Ward, Tokyo, Japan.

Overview
The park was donated by Italy to commemorate "Italy in Japan 2001", a project that aimed to showcase Italy’s art, culture, design, fashion, music, science and technology in Japan.
It is an authentic Italian garden with Italian sculptures and fountains.

Access
 By train: 5 minutes’ walk from Shiodome Station on the Toei Ōedo Line

See also
 Parks and gardens in Tokyo
 National Parks of Japan

References

External links
 Website of Shiba Italy Park (in Japanese)
Parks and gardens in Tokyo